Ian Thomas LVO (died 2 June 1993) was a British dress designer who worked for Queen Elizabeth II of the United Kingdom.

Born in Middle Barton, Oxfordshire, he later studied fashion at the Oxford College of Art and worked as a personal assistant to the couturier Norman Hartnell from 1953 to 1970 before opening his own business.

He was appointed LVO in the 1977 Silver Jubilee and Birthday Honours.

References

British fashion designers
Lieutenants of the Royal Victorian Order
1993 deaths
Year of birth missing